Kacper Szymon Kozłowski (born 16 October 2003) is a Polish professional footballer who plays as a midfielder for Dutch club Vitesse, on loan from Brighton & Hove Albion, and the Poland national team.

Club career
Kozłowski started his career with Pogoń Szczecin. In January 2022, he transferred to Premier League side Brighton & Hove Albion where he was immediately loaned to Brighton's sister club Union SG of Belgian First Division A for the rest of the season.

In August 2022, Kozłowski joined Vitesse in the Netherlands on loan until the end of the 2022–23 season.

International career
In June 2021, Kozłowski featured for Poland at UEFA Euro 2020 in a 1–1 draw with Spain, to become the youngest player of any nationality to play at a European Championship, aged 17 years and 246 days, breaking the previous record of Jude Bellingham, who himself had broken the same record only six days prior.

Personal life
On 10 January 2020, Kozłowski suffered a traffic accident that almost ended his football career.

Career statistics

Club

International

Honours
Individual
Ekstraklasa Young Player of the Month: December 2020

References

External links

2003 births
Living people
People from Koszalin
Polish footballers
Association football midfielders
Pogoń Szczecin players
Royale Union Saint-Gilloise players
SBV Vitesse players
Ekstraklasa players
Belgian Pro League players
Poland international footballers
Poland youth international footballers
Poland under-21 international footballers
UEFA Euro 2020 players
Polish expatriate footballers
Expatriate footballers in Belgium
Polish expatriate sportspeople in Belgium
Expatriate footballers in England
Polish expatriate sportspeople in England
Expatriate footballers in the Netherlands
Polish expatriate sportspeople in the Netherlands